South Bank Technopark at London South Bank University, England, houses the main administration for the university, including the Vice-Chancellor's Office, under the leadership of Prof. David Phoenix.

The Technopark building was opened in November 1985. Hugh West became its CEO in 1988. It is designed in a modular way, with a floor area of 3,000 m2, which can be divided into units from around 19 m2 in size. As well as university offices, there are also a number of small companies that rent space in the building. The Technopark currently houses 37 high-tech businesses.

Technopark is located in London Road just north of the Elephant and Castle on the east side of the road. The Elephant and Castle tube station is very close to the building.

London Knowledge Innovation Centre 

In 2006, the University opened a business incubator at South Bank Technopark called London Knowledge Innovation Centre (LKIC), with serviced office space, business advice, virtual incubation, hot desk rental and strategic mentoring. LKIC was launched by the well-known inventor Trevor Baylis OBE and has built up a client base of early-stage knowledge-based businesses.

See also

 List of science parks in the United Kingdom

External links 
 UK Science Park Association information
 A typical Technopark office

1987 establishments in the United Kingdom
Technopark
Office buildings in the London Borough of Southwark
Cultural and educational buildings in London
Science parks in the United Kingdom